Charles Valentine may refer to:

 Charles James Valentine (1837–1900), English ironmaster and politician
 Charles L. Valentine (1846–1925), member of the Wisconsin State Assembly
 Charles Wilfred Valentine (1879–1964), British educationalist and psychologist